The 2021–22 season was the 114th season in the existence of Real Betis and the club's seventh consecutive season in the top flight of Spanish football. In addition to the domestic league, Real Betis participated in this season's editions of the Copa del Rey and the UEFA Europa League.

Players

First-team squad
.

Reserve team

Out on loan

Transfers

In

Out

Pre-season and friendlies

Competitions

Overall record

La Liga

League table

Results summary

Results by round

Matches
The league fixtures were announced on 30 June 2021.

Copa del Rey

UEFA Europa League

Group stage

The draw for the group stage was held on 27 August 2021.

Knockout phase

Knockout round play-offs
The knockout round play-offs draw was held on 13 December 2021.

Round of 16
The draw for the round of 16 was held on 25 February 2022.

Statistics

Appearances and goals
Last updated 20 May 2022.

|-
! colspan=14 style=background:#dcdcdc; text-align:center|Goalkeepers

|-
! colspan=14 style=background:#dcdcdc; text-align:center|Defenders

|-
! colspan=14 style=background:#dcdcdc; text-align:center|Midfielders

|-
! colspan=14 style=background:#dcdcdc; text-align:center|Forwards

|-
! colspan=14 style=background:#dcdcdc; text-align:center| Players who have made an appearance or had a squad number this season but have left the club either permanently or on loan

|-
|}

Goalscorers

Notes

References

Real Betis seasons
Real Betis
2021–22 UEFA Europa League participants seasons